"Dream the Day Away" is a song by Australian singer-songwriter Candice Alley. Alley co-wrote the song with Trevor Steel and John Holliday, who also produced the track. The song was released on 8 September 2003 as the second single from Alley's debut studio album, Colorblind (2003). The song peaked at number 45 on the Australian Singles Chart.

Track listing
Australian CD single (9809427)
 "Dream the Day Away" (Four on the Floor mix) – 4:06
 "Falling" (Hot Snax remix) – 4:04
 "Dream the Day Away" – 4:06

Charts

References

2003 singles
2003 songs
Candice Alley songs
Universal Music Australia singles